Malhori is a village and municipality in Jammu district of the Indian union territory of Jammu and Kashmir.

References

Villages in Jammu district